James Trimble (c. 1817 – January 1, 1885) was an Irish-born physician and political figure in British Columbia, Canada. He represented Victoria City in the Legislative Assembly of British Columbia from 1871 to 1878.

He was born in County Tyrone. Trimble was a surgeon in the British Army until 1849 when he went to California. He arrived in Victoria, British Columbia in 1858 and served as medical supervisor for the Royal Hospital there. He served in the Legislative Assembly of Vancouver Island. Trimble was the first Speaker of the Legislative Assembly of British Columbia, serving from 1872 to 1878. He was mayor of Victoria from 1868 to 1870.

References

Speakers of the Legislative Assembly of British Columbia
Mayors of Victoria, British Columbia
1885 deaths
Year of birth uncertain